Kristin L. Hoganson is an American historian specializing in the history of the United States.  She teaches at the University of Illinois at Urbana–Champaign.

Early life

Hoganson was educated at Yale University receiving her B.A. in 1987 and Ph.D. In 1995.

Career
Hoganson is a professor of history at the University of Illinois, Urbana-Champaign, where she teaches on American empire, the United States in the world, and food in global history.

Hoganson's article, “Meat in the Middle: Converging Borderlands in the U.S. Midwest, 1865-1900,” published in the Journal of American History, won the Ray Allen Billington prize from the Western History Association for the best article in Western History and the Wayne D. Rasmussen Prize from the Agricultural History Society.

She is president of the Society for Historians of American Foreign Relations.

Books
The Heartland: An American History (New York: Penguin Press, 2019).
Consumers’ Imperium:The Global Production of American Domesticity, 1865–1920 (University of North Carolina Press, 2007).
Fighting for American Manhood: How Gender Politics Provoked the Spanish-American and Philippine-American Wars (New Haven: Yale University Press, 1998).
American Empire at the Turn of the Twentieth Century (Boston: Bedford/St. Martin's, 2016).

References

External links

21st-century American historians
Yale University alumni
American women historians
University of Illinois Urbana-Champaign faculty
Year of birth missing (living people)
Place of birth missing (living people)
Living people
Historians of the United States
21st-century American women